Lisabeth or Lizabeth is a given name and a surname. Notable people with the name include:

Given name
 Lisabeth Hughes Abramson (born 1955), American justice of the Kentucky Supreme Court
 Lisabeth H. Muhrer, Norwegian handball player
 Lizabeth Cohen (21st century), American historian
 Lizabeth Scott (1922-2015), American actress
 Lizabeth A. Turner (1829-1907), National President, Woman's Relief Corps

Surname
 Johan Lisabeth (born 1971), Belgian athlete who specialised in high hurdles

See also
 Elizabeth (disambiguation)

English-language feminine given names